"Hanging Around" is a song written by Peter Svensson and Nina Persson for the Cardigans' 1998 album Gran Turismo. The song is the album's sixth track, and was released as its third single on 12 July 1999, and charted at number 17 on the UK Singles Chart. The music video was directed by Sophie Muller, and is based on the 1965 Roman Polanski film, Repulsion, with Nina Persson playing the role of  'Carol'.

Track listing
UK Maxi Single
Hanging Around (Alternative Radio Mix) - 3:41
My Favourite Game (Rollo's Mix) - 6:37
Hanging Around (Nåid Remix) -4:10)
Hanging Around (CD-Rom Video) - 3:41

Alternate Maxi Single
Hanging Around (Radio Version) - 3:43
Hanging Around (Jasmine St. Claire Mix) - 4:49
Hanging Around (Nåid Remix) - 4:10
Erase / Rewind (Director's Cut Video) - 3:35

Credits and personnel
Vocals: Nina Persson
Guitar: Peter Svensson
Bass: Magnus Sveningsson
Guitar: Lars-Olof Johansson
Drums: Bengt Lagerberg
Recorded at Country Hell, Tambourine Studios, Skurup, Sweden
Producer: Tore Johansson
Engineer: Tore Johansson, Janne Waldenmark
Assistant engineer: Lars Göransson
Audio mixing: Tore Johansson
Mixing assistant: Jim Caruana
Mastering by: Björn Engelmann

Charts

References

External links
The Cardigans' official website

1998 songs
1999 singles
The Cardigans songs
Stockholm Records singles
Polydor Records singles
Music videos directed by Sophie Muller
Songs written by Peter Svensson
Songs written by Nina Persson